The 11th South American Youth Championships in Athletics were held in Santiago, Chile, from October 2–4, 1992.

Medal summary
Medal winners are published for boys and girls.  Complete results can be found on the "World Junior Athletics History" website.

Men

Women

Medal table (unofficial)

Participation (unofficial)
Detailed result lists can be found on the "World Junior Athletics History" website.  An unofficial count yields the number of about 251 athletes from about 11 countries:  

 (53)
 (12)
 (51)
 (51)
 (10)
 (20)
 Panama (1)
 (4)
 Peru (11)
 (28)
 (10)

References

External links
World Junior Athletics History

South American U18 Championships in Athletics
1992 in Chilean sport
South American U18 Championships
International athletics competitions hosted by Chile
1992 in youth sport